Hridoyer Bandhon also is a Bangladeshi Bengali-language film, which was directed by Bangladeshi famous film director F I Manik and produced by Mosharaf Hossain Tula. The film was released in Eid-ul-Fitr 2001. It is a romance and family drama based film. Stars include Riaz, Shabnur, Amin Khan, Keya, Wasimul Bari Rajib and Anwara. The film got a great popularity throughout   all categories of film viewers in Bangladesh.The film is an unofficial remake of the 2000 Hindi Language film titled Dhadkan starring Akshay Kumar, Sunil Shetty, Shilpa Shetty and Mahima Chaudhry.

Plot
Sagarika (Shabnur) who is a girl that hails from an extremely rich and influential family. Her father Raihan Chowdhury (Wasimul Bari Rajib) is a renowned businessman and has many dreams for his daughter. But Sagarika is in love with Raju (Amin Khan) who is very poor and often cannot even afford to clothe himself properly. Raju also loves Sagarika and wants to marry her so has to meet her father.

When Sagarika puts forward to her parents the proposal of marrying Raju she is rebuked and meets an outright refusal, as they could not accept Raju. Moreover, her parents have chosen for her a wealthy suitor from Chittagong. Not wanting to hurt her parents Sagarika finally gives in to their wishes and marries Akash (Riaz) who her parents believe will be a perfect match for her.

Akash is a man of great ideals, who believes in giving a rightful place to his wife and respects her sensibilities. But, despite this he is unable to win Sagarika's love at first and their marriage remains on the edge. However, after seeing the magnanimity of her husband's heart in forgiving and accepting her, she realises she has fallen in love with him.

For three years Sagarika leads a life of bliss and becomes an ideal wife. But suddenly on their 3rd wedding anniversary party, Raju returns and is intent on winning Sagarika back. Raju is now a wealthy businessman and now Sagarika finds herself on the crossroads where she has to fight for her husband with her former lover. But Sagarika is now in love with her husband and has no wish to return to her former love. When Akash realises she has no wish to return to him, he is intent on ruining her life. But the truth wins in the end when Sagarika tells Raju she is pregnant with Akash's child. Raju realises his folly and accepts his friend and business partner Mitali (Keya) as his life partner as she secretly loved him.

Cast
 Riaz  as Akash
 Shabnur as Sagorika
 Amin Khan as Raju
 Keya as Mitali
 Wasimul Bari Rajib as Raihan Chowdhury
 Anwara as Raju's mother
 Dulari Chakraborty as Akash's step mother
 Mafia as Akash's step brother
 Kabila as Kallu
 Rathindranath Roy as himself, performing the song Bodhu Bese Konya
 Momtaz as herself, performing the song Bodhu Bese Konya

Music
The film's music was directed by Shawkat Ali Imon. Lyrics by Kabir Bokul also singers are Monir Khan, Asif, Moutushi, Andru kishore, Momtaz and Rabindranath Roy. The original music in Hindi was composed by Nadeem-Shravan.

Soundtrack

Box office
Hridoyer Bandhon film released was 2001 in an Eid and gets a great popularity of the all categories film viewers in Bangladesh.

References

2001 films
2001 romantic drama films
Bengali-language Bangladeshi films
Bangladeshi romantic drama films
Films scored by Shawkat Ali Emon
Bangladeshi remakes of Indian films
2000s Bengali-language films